Andøya is the northernmost island in the Vesterålen archipelago, situated about  inside the Arctic circle. Andøya is located in Andøy Municipality in Nordland county, Norway. The main population centres on the island include the villages of Andenes, Bleik, and Risøyhamn.

The island is connected to the neighboring island of Hinnøya via the Andøy Bridge. The Andfjorden lies to the east of the island, the Risøysundet strait lies to the south and east side of the island, and the Gavlfjorden lies to the southwest side. The Norwegian Sea lies to the west and north.

The numerous bog areas on Andøya are used for the extensive production of peat. Andøya is also well known for its cloudberries. Andøya Space, which was founded in 1962, is also located on the island near the Andøya Air Station.

Important Bird Area
A 10,000 ha area comprising low-lying boggy ground in central Andøya, along with a stretch of the eastern coast and the lake of Skogvollvatnet on the west coast, has been designated an Important Bird Area (IBA) by BirdLife International (BLI) because it supports several thousand barnacle and pinkfooted geese on passage migration, as well as about ten breeding pairs of Eurasian curlews. Protected areas within or overlapping the site include the Skogvoll, Risøysundet, and Åholmen nature reserves and the Skogvoll and Risøysundet Ramsar sites.

Media gallery

References

External links

Andøy
Vesterålen
Important Bird Areas of Norway
Important Bird Areas of Arctic islands
Nature reserves in Norway
Ramsar sites in Norway